Soběšín is a municipality and village in Kutná Hora District in the Central Bohemian Region of the Czech Republic. It has about 200 inhabitants.

Administrative parts
The village of Otryby is an administrative part of Soběšín.

References

Villages in Kutná Hora District